Darwin Zahedy Saleh (born October 29, 1960) is an Indonesian economist. He was part of the Second United Indonesia Cabinet and served as Minister of Energy and Mineral Resources in Indonesia from October 22, 2009, to October 19, 2011. Saleh is a noted academic who is a long-time lecturer at the University of Indonesia and was a financial consultant, manager and banker.

References

Indonesian economists
1960 births
Living people
People from Riau
Government ministers of Indonesia
Academic staff of the University of Indonesia